Dragan Jovanović is a Serbian politician who was the mayor of Topola from 2004 to 2014 and is now serving his fourth term in the National Assembly of Serbia. Formerly a prominent member of New Serbia (Nova Srbija, NS), he has been the leader of Better Serbia (Bolja Srbija, BS) since its founding in 2017.

Early life and career
Jovanović was born in Aranđelovac, in what was then the Socialist Republic of Serbia in the Socialist Federal Republic of Yugoslavia. He graduated from the Faculty of Mechanical Engineering with a major in industrial management.

Politician
Jovanović was New Serbia's secretary-general from 2003 until 2005, when he was elected as a party vice-president. He oversaw party leader Velimir Ilić's campaign in the 2003 Serbian presidential election.

Mayor of Topola
Serbia introduced the direct election of mayors with the 2004 local elections. Jovanović ran in Topola with a dual endorsement from New Serbia and the Democratic Party of Serbia (Demokratska stranka Srbije, DSS) and was elected in the first round of voting, defeating seven other candidates. The NS–DSS alliance also won a convincing victory in the concurrent election for the Topola municipal assembly.

In December 2007, Jovanović and other members of New Serbia joined with members of the Serbian Radical Party (Srpska radikalna stranka, SRS) to prevent the B92 program Peščanik from recording an episode at Aranđelovac's House of Culture; the protesters took control of the microphones and prevented the recording from taking place. This act received international attention, including a reference in the United States Department of State's Country Report on Human Rights Practices for 2007, where it was noted that Jovanović made threats against B92 in a subsequent interview. In the aftermath of this controversy, New Serbia members accused B92 of pursuing an "anti-Serb and anti-Constitutional campaign." B92 responded that New Serbia's criticism was actually motivated by its own frequent criticisms of Velimir Ilić.

The direct election of mayors proved to be a short-lived experiment and was abolished with the 2008 local elections; since this time, Serbian mayors have been chosen by elected members of the relevant municipal assemblies. The NS–DSS alliance won a majority victory in Topola in 2008, and Jovanović was chosen for a second term as mayor. In 2009, he joined other Serbian politicians from across the political spectrum in accusing Croatian authorities of preventing Serbs from returning to the country and participating in local elections.

For the 2012 local elections, Jovanović led a local alliance of New Serbia, the DSS, and the Party of United Pensioners of Serbia (Partija ujedinjenih penzionera Srbije, PUPS) in Topola. The alliance won an increased majority, and Jovanović was chosen afterward for a third term in the mayor's office. He stood down as mayor in 2014, as he could not hold a dual mandate as a parliamentarian and an executive member of the local government. He was instead chosen as president (i.e., speaker) of the municipal assembly.

New Serbia parliamentarian
New Serbia contested the 2003 Serbian parliamentary election in an alliance with the Serbian Renewal Movement (Srpski pokret obnove, SPO), and Jovanović was given the 201st position on their combined list. The list won twenty-two seats, and he was not included afterward in his party's delegation. (From 2000 to 2011, mandates in Serbian parliamentary elections were awarded to sponsoring parties or coalitions rather than individual candidates, and it was common practice for the mandates to be assigned out of numerical order. Jovanović could have been given a seat despite his low position on the list, although in the event he was not.) New Serbia later contested the 2007 parliamentary election in an alliance the DSS, and Jovanović appeared in the twenty-seventh position. The alliance won forty-seven seats, and he was again not given a mandate.

Jovanović received the eleventh position on another combined DSS–NS list in the 2008 Serbian parliamentary election and was on this occasion given a mandate when the list won thirty seats. His first term in the assembly was brief. The overall results of the 2008 election were inconclusive, but the For a European Serbia (Za evropsku Srbiju, ZES) alliance eventually formed a coalition government with the Socialist Party of Serbia (Socijalistička partija Srbije, SPS), and New Serbia served in opposition. Velimir Ilić, who had hitherto been a cabinet minister, lost his position in government. Jovanović resigned his seat on 8 July 2008 in order to allow Ilić to enter the assembly. 

Serbia's electoral system was reformed in 2011, such that parliamentary mandates were assigned in numerical order to candidates on successful lists. New Serbia joined an alliance led by the Serbian Progressive Party (Srpska napredna stranka, SNS) for the 2012 parliamentary election and continued its alliance with the Progressives into the national assembly elections of 2014 and 2016. Jovanović was not a candidate in 2012, but he received the ninety-eighth position on the SNS-led list in 2014 and was elected when the list won a landslide victory with 158 out of 250 seats. He served as a government supporter and was a member of the committee on spatial planning, transport, infrastructure, and telecommunications; a deputy member of the committee on economy, regional development, trade, tourism, and energy; a deputy member of the committee for agriculture, forestry, and water management; and a member of the parliamentary friendship groups with Azerbaijan, Belarus, the Czech Republic, France, Greece, Italy, Montenegro, the Republic of Macedonia (now North Macedonia), Russia, and the United Kingdom.

Jovanović was given the 107th position on the SNS-led list in 2016 and was elected to a third term when the list won another majority victory with 131 mandates. In the parliament that followed, he was a member of the spatial planning committee, a deputy member of the agriculture committee and the committee for environmental protection, and a member of the parliamentary friendship groups with Armenia, Belarus, Belgium, Croatia, France, Italy, the Republic of Macedonia, Montenegro, Romania, Russia, Turkey, and the United Kingdom.

He was also received the lead position on the SNS-led list in Topola in the 2016 Serbian local elections, which were held concurrently with the parliamentary vote, and was re-elected when the list won twenty-nine out of forty-one seats. He was chosen afterward for another term as speaker of the local assembly.

Independent member
In January 2017, Velimir Ilić withdrew his support from Serbia's SNS-led administration. Jovanović, speaking as a party vice-president, stated that Ilić was entitled to his personal opinions but that the party as a whole would continue to support the administration. Ilić then expelled Jovanović from the party, arguing that he had disobeyed the decisions of the party leadership, had made false claims about a diploma, and was compromised because of his involvement in a 2012 car accident. Jovanović rejected these claims and said that Ilić was really concerned about a possible leadership challenge.

At around the time that Jovanović was expelled from New Serbia, fellow deputies Dubravka Filipovski and Mladen Grujić voluntarily left the party due to their opposition to Ilić and his decision to withdraw New Serbia's support from the SNS-led administration. Initially, all three ex-NS members continued to support the administration as independents.

Founding of Better Serbia
In June 2017, Jovanović joined with Miroslav Parović and Vladan Glišić to present a manifesto for a new right-wing political party. Jovanović said that the group would offer conservative Serb voters a third choice, distinct from the country's existing government and opposition blocs. Shortly after this meeting, he launched a new political party called Better Serbia with himself as leader.

Better Serbia and Healthy Serbia (Zdrava Srbija, ZS) fielded a joint list in the 2020 Serbian parliamentary election, and Jovanović was appeared on the list in the third position. By this time, Jovanović had withdrawn his support for Serbia's SNS administration, saying that it had turned out to be worse than the administration that preceded it. The ZS–BS list did not cross the electoral threshold to win representation in the assembly.

2020 local elections and after
Better Serbia fielded its own list in Topola for the 2020 local elections, with Jovanović in the lead position. The list won a narrow victory over the Progressive Party's coalition list, sixteen seats to fifteen. The Progressives subsequently formed a new coalition government with smaller parties, and Better Serbia served in opposition.

Jovanović was expelled from the Topola municipal assembly in November 2020 on the grounds that he had changed his residence from Topola to Belgrade and was no longer on the local voters list. Jovanović responded that this decision was based on falsified information and that he had actually been expelled for being a "thorn in the side" of the local authorities.

In April 2021, the defection of two delegates from the Progressives allowed Jovanović and Better Serbia to form a new municipal administration. Jovanović did not return to the mayor's office but was instead named as a member of the municipal council (i.e., the executive branch of the municipal government) with responsibility for infrastructure and the economy.

Return to the National Assembly
Notwithstanding the recent animosity between Better Serbia and the Progressive Party, Jovanović announced in February 2022 that the parties had re-established their alliance and that Better Serbia would contest the 2022 Serbian parliamentary election on the SNS list. Jovanović appeared in the sixty-third position on this list and was re-elected when it won 120 seats; formally, his endorsement was from the SNS. 

Jovanović is now a member of the spatial planning committee and the agriculture committee; a deputy member of the committee on the judiciary, public administration, and local self-government; a deputy member of the committee on finance, state budget, and control of public spending; the head of the parliamentary friendship group with Namibia; and a member of the friendship groups with Albania, Austria, Belgium, Bosnia and Herzegovina, Croatia, Cuba, Cyprus, the Czech Republic, Germany, Greece, Hungary, Italy, Japan, Montenegro, Slovakia, Slovenia, Spain, Ukraine, and the United Kingdom. By virtue of once again serving in the national assembly, he stood down from the Topola city council on 10 September 2022.

Electoral record

Local (Topola)

References

1972 births
Living people
People from Topola
Mayors of places in Serbia
Members of the National Assembly (Serbia)
New Serbia politicians
Better Serbia politicians